Belgium competed at the 2020 Winter Youth Olympics in Lausanne, Switzerland from 9 to 22 January 2020.

Medalists
Medals awarded to participants of mixed-NOC teams are represented in italics. These medals are not counted towards the individual NOC medal tally.

Alpine skiing

Boys

Freestyle skiing

Ski cross

Ice hockey

Mixed NOC 3x3 tournament 

Boys
Tibo Van Reeth

Girls
Anke Steeno

Short track speed skating

Boys

Skeleton

Snowboarding

Halfpipe, Slopestyle, & Big Air

Speed skating

Girls

Mass Start

Mixed

See also
Belgium at the 2020 Summer Olympics

References

2020 in Belgian sport
Nations at the 2020 Winter Youth Olympics
Belgium at the Youth Olympics